Theodor Weissenberger (21 December 1914 – 11 June 1950) was a German Luftwaffe military aviator during World War II and a fighter ace credited with 208 enemy aircraft shot down in 375 combat missions. The majority of his victories were claimed near the Arctic Ocean in the northern sector of the Eastern Front, but he also claimed 33 victories over the Western Front. He claimed eight of these victories over the Western Allies while flying the Messerschmitt Me 262 jet fighter.

Born in Mühlheim am Main in the German Empire, Weissenberger, who had been a glider pilot in his youth, volunteered for service in the Luftwaffe of Nazi Germany in 1936. Following flight training, he was posted to the heavy fighter squadron of Jagdgeschwader 77 (JG 77—77th Fighter Wing) in 1941. He claimed his first aerial victory over Norway on 24 October 1941. After 23 aerial victories as heavy fighter pilot, he received the German Cross in Gold and was then posted to Jagdgeschwader 5 (JG 5—5th Fighter Wing) in September 1942. There he received the Knight's Cross of the Iron Cross on 13 November 1942 after 38 aerial victories.

In June 1943, Weissenberger was appointed Staffelkapitän of 7. Staffel of JG 5. Following his 112th aerial victory, he was awarded the Knight's Cross of the Iron Cross with Oak Leaves on 2 August 1943. He was appointed Staffelkapitän of 6. Staffel in September 1943 and in March 1944 he was given command of II. Gruppe of JG 5 which was operating in Defense of the Reich missions. In June 1944 he took command of I. Gruppe of JG 5 which defended against the Invasion of Normandy. Weissenberger claimed 25 aerial victories in this theater, which included his 200th victory on 25 July 1944.

After conversion training to the Me 262 jet fighter, he was appointed commander of I. Gruppe of Jagdgeschwader 7 "Nowotny" (JG 7—7th Fighter Wing), the first operational jet fighter wing in the world, in November 1944. Promoted to Major (major), he took command of JG 7 "Nowotny" as a Geschwaderkommodore in January 1945, a position he held until the end of hostilities.

He was killed in a car racing accident on 11 June 1950 at the Nürburgring.

Early life and career
Weissenberger, the son of a plant nursery owner, was born on 21 December 1914 in Mühlheim am Main in the Grand Duchy of Hesse of the German Empire. He had a brother Otto who also served as a pilot in Luftwaffe. As a glider pilot with the German Air Sports Association, he made his maiden flight on 16 November 1935. On 20 July 1941 he logged his 645th flight as a glider pilot, in total 196 hours and 46 minutes of powerless flight. Most of these flights were made as an instructor over the Rhön Mountains, Silesia and Bavaria.

He joined the military service of the Luftwaffe with 2./Flieger-Ersatz-Abteilung 14 (2nd Company of Flier Replacement Unit 14) in Detmold on 19 October 1936. There he was promoted to Feldwebel of the Reserves on 1 December 1940.

World War II
Weissenberger was posted to a front-line unit on 27 August 1941, almost two years after the start of World War II. His unit, 1.(Z)/Jagdgeschwader 77 (JG 77—77th Fighter Wing) was a Zerstörer (Z—heavy fighter or destroyer) Staffel (squadron) flying the twin-engine, up to three-seat, Messerschmitt Bf 110. The unit was stationed in Norway, operating in the Murmansk area in support of Finnish operations against the Soviet Union during the Continuation War.  Germany regarded its operations in the region as part of its overall war efforts on the Eastern Front, and it provided Finland with critical material support and military cooperation. There he flew his first combat mission of the war on 13 September 1941.

War on the Arctic Front
Weissenberger claimed his first aerial victory, a Polikarpov I-153 biplane fighter, on 24 October 1941 and was awarded the Iron Cross 2nd Class on 6 November 1941. He was promoted to Oberfeldwebel of the Reserves on 1 February 1942. During this phase of his military career, he often got into trouble with his superiors regarding his lack of discipline. A few times his comrades had to intervene to save him from punishment. On 24 January 1942, Weissenberger and Oberleutnant Max Franzisket flew on a ground attack mission against the Kirov Railway line. At 13:40, he claimed a Hawker Hurricane shot down, his third aerial victory.

In February 1942 he mostly flew escort fighter missions for Junkers Ju 87 and Ju 88 bombers attacking the harbors at Ferosero, Polyarnoye, present-day Polyarny, and Murmansk. Weissenberger received the Iron Cross 1st Class on 17 February 1942. On 25 February he claimed two more Hurricanes shot down at 11:15 and 11:22, his fourth and fifth victories. His Staffel was redesignated as 10.(Z) of Jagdgeschwader 5 (JG 5—5th Fighter Wing) on 16 March 1942 and subordinated to JG 5. In April 1942 he claimed eight victories, three of which were shot down on 15 April during two combat missions west of Murmansk. On 25 April at 07:20 Weissenberger took off at Kirkenes for an emergency intercept mission against 20 Soviet Petlyakov Pe-2 bombers. He shot down two bombers before his aircraft was hit by the defensive fire. The right engine started burning and he was forced to disengage from the enemy. Returning to the German lines, he made a safe belly landing.

Weissenberger became an "ace-in-a-day" for the first time on 10 May 1942 when he shot down five enemy aircraft, aerial victories 14–18, between 16:45 and 16:57 while on a Ju 87 escort mission. These victories were claimed over aircraft of 2 Gvardeyskiy Smeshannyy Aviatsionny Polk (2 GSAP—2nd Soviet Guards Composite Aviation Division), which lost ten Hurricanes destroyed and three damaged. In June 1942, JG 5 was augmented by another group, VI. Gruppe (4th Group) under the command of Hauptmann Hans Kriegel. This led to a number of Staffel redesignations. Weissenberger's 10.(Z) Staffel was renamed as 13.(Z) Staffel and remained subordinated to JG 5. He transferred from the reserve force to active service and was promoted to Leutnant (second lieutenant) on 1 July 1942. In early September he was transferred to 6. Staffel of JG 5, now flying the single-engine, single-seat, Messerschmitt Bf 109 fighter. By this date, Weissenberger, as a Zerstörer pilot, had claimed 23 aerial victories in addition to 15 locomotives, 2 FLAK installations, a radio station, a railway station and other ground targets destroyed and was awarded the German Cross in Gold on 8 September 1942.

Knight's Cross of the Iron Cross
At the time, 6. Staffel at the time was based in Petsamo, present-day Pechenga in Murmansk Oblast, Russia. Weissenberger took off on his first Bf 109 combat mission at 14:00 on 15 September 1942 after he had spent a few days familiarizing himself with the single-engine fighter aircraft. The mission, flown by 10 Bf 109 fighters from 6. Staffel, was a combat air patrol in the vicinity of Murmashi. The flight encountered enemy aircraft and Weissenberger filed claims over two Curtiss P-40 Warhawk Lend-Lease fighters shot down at 14:31 and 14:33. These were his first victories claimed on the Bf 109, taking his total to 25 victories. A week later, on 22 September, Weissenberger and 6. Staffel were again patrolling the airspace near the Soviet airfield at Murmashi. During this mission, he claimed three more aerial victories, over Hurricanes shot down between 14:59 and 15:05.

On 27 September 1942, Weissenberger claimed five victories during the course of two combat missions. During the first mission, he shot down a Bell P-39 Airacobra at 11:36. On his second mission, which began at 15:00, he encountered a formation of roughly 30 aircraft, claiming four Hurricanes shot down from 15:49 to 15:56, a time space of seven minutes. This "ace-in-a-day" achievement took his total to 33 aerial victories. On 22 October 1942, Weissenberger was tasked with fighter protection for a reconnaissance aircraft. The engine of his Bf 109 F-4 seized up just west of Murmansk. He managed to nurse his aircraft back to the German lines before bailing out. He was picked up eight hours later by a Gebirgsjäger (mountain infantry) patrol and brought back to his Staffel. Following this event he was given one week of rest. He returned to combat on 30 October 1942, and during two combat missions again achieved "ace-in-a-day" status. He claimed three victories on his first mission and two P-40s at 15:00 and 15:06 on his second mission of the day. This took his total to 38 aerial victories and he was honored with the presentation of the Knight's Cross of the Iron Cross on 13 November 1942. That day, Feldwebel Heinrich Bartels from 8. Staffel of JG 5 was also awarded the Knight's Cross.

Following the winter break, Weissenberger claimed 33 further victories between 6–28 March 1943. Often he achieved multiple victories per day; six claims on 10 March, victories 43 to 48 on 10 March, victories 49 to 53 on 12 March, and numbers 54 to 57 on 13 March. A ground attack mission against the airfield at Salmiyarvi on 28 March was his last action of the month. Weissenberger claimed three P-39s shot down during this mission, but was himself hit by anti-aircraft fire and had to make a forced landing. He was picked up and returned by a Fiesler Fi 156 "Storch". On 13 April 1943, a flight of five aircraft from 6. Staffel claimed 18 Soviet aircraft destroyed without loss. Six of the enemy aircraft were credited to Weissenberger, shot down between 17:05 and 17:16. This took his score to 77 aerial victories. On 13 May, he claimed four P-39s destroyed, representing victories 83 to 86, and he was promoted to Oberleutnant on 1 June 1943.

Oak Leaves to the Knight's Cross
Weissenberger claimed another five victories on 8 June 1943 north of Murmansk between 17:15 and 17:23. This brought his score to 91 aerial victories and on 15 June he was appointed Staffelkapitän (squadron leader) of 7. Staffel of JG 5. In the period 15 June to 4 July, 7. Staffel claimed 122 aerial victories under his leadership. The heaviest fighting occurred on 22 June over the Karelia Front, during which his Staffel claimed 13 victories, of which three were Hurricanes shot down by Weissenberger. A day later, he again claimed three aircraft shot down, comprising victories 95 to 97.

On 4 July 1943, Weissenberger led 7. Staffel to 16 aerial victories, while providing fighter cover for a departing German naval task force. First, Weissenberger claimed a Pe-2 reconnaissance aircraft shot down at 21:07. A flight of 25 to 30 enemy bombers and torpedo bombers was then spotted at 21:50. Weissenberger claimed an Ilyushin Il-2 "Sturmovik" at 21:54, his 100th aerial victory. He was the 43rd Luftwaffe pilot to achieve the century mark. The Staffel returned to its airfield at 22:19 without having sustained any losses during the encounter. Weissenberger alone had claimed seven victories during this mission, taking his total to 104 victories.

He achieved "ace-in-a-day" status for the fourth time on 25 July 1943, claiming aerial victories numbers 108 to 112. Following his 112th victory, he was awarded the Knight's Cross of the Iron Cross with Oak Leaves on 2 August 1943, the 266th member of the Wehrmacht to be so honored. The presentation was made by Adolf Hitler at the Wolf's Lair, Hitler's headquarters in Rastenburg, present-day Kętrzyn in Poland. Five other Luftwaffe officers were presented with awards that day by Hitler, Hauptmann Egmont Prinz zur Lippe-Weißenfeld, Hauptmann Manfred Meurer, Hauptmann Heinrich Ehrler, Oberleutnant Joachim Kirschner, Hauptmann Werner Schröer were also awarded the Oak Leaves, and Major Helmut Lent received the Swords to his Knight's Cross with Oak Leaves.

Weissenberger was placed in command of 6. Staffel on 14 September 1943 and in October and November added five more victories to his score, four of which were achieved on 3 November over the Rybachy Peninsula. At the end of 1943, II. Gruppe (2nd Group) was ordered to relocate further south to the front near Nevel, Leningrad and Lake Ilmen. Relocating from Pskov, 6. Staffel arrived at their new airfield at Idritsa on 11 November 1943 and was in action again on 17 November. In January 1944, II. Gruppe was subordinated to Luftflotte 2 (2nd Air Fleet) in the middle sector of the Eastern Front in support of the defensive battles at Vitebsk. The Staffel flew combat missions from Orsha and Polotsk. Between 10:50 to 10:58 on 1 February 1944, Weissenberger achieved his fifth "ace-in-a-day", taking his total to 124. On 28 February, he claimed his 140th aerial victory.

At the end of February 1944, II. Gruppe relocated again to Polotsk and then to Jakobstadt, present-day Jēkabpils in Latvia, and on 16 March Weissenberger claimed his 141st victory. Among his four victories claimed on 20 March were three Il-2 ground attack aircraft. On 25 March 1944, another "ace-in-a-day" achievement saw his total increase to 153 aerial victories. In late March 1944, II. Gruppe was transferred to the far north again, and was based at Alakurtti. Here they defended against the Vyborg–Petrozavodsk Offensive.

Weissenberger was appointed Gruppenkommandeur (group commander) of II. Gruppe of JG 5 on 26 March 1944, succeeding Hauptmann Horst Carganico who was transferred. Command of 6. Staffel was passed to Oberleutnant Ernst Scheufele. He claimed three aircraft shot down on 4 April, and four more on 9 April, taking his victories from 159 to 162. At the end of April 1944, II. Gruppe relocated to Jakobstadt, withdrawing from the Arctic Front for the last time. On 17 May he claimed victories 169 to 172, and the next day shot down three Yakovlev Yak-9s, taking his total to 175. These were his last victories on the Eastern Front. At the end of May 1944, II. Gruppe was transferred to Defense of the Reich duties and was relocated to Gardelegen Airfield in Germany.

Combat on the Western Front
Weissenberger was promoted to Hauptmann on 1 June 1944. On 3 June he arrived in Herzogenaurach to take over command of I. Gruppe (1st Group) of JG 5. The former Gruppenkommandeur Major Horst Carganico had been killed in a flying accident on 27 May 1944. Three days after Weissenberger took command, the Allied invasion of Normandy began. To counter the invasion, elements of I./JG 5 were transported to France by train that afternoon. The following day, Weissenberger took I. Gruppe into combat, achieving "ace-in-a-day" status once again on his first day of combat on the Western Front. His 176th victory was over a Republic P-47 Thunderbolt shot down at 09:05. He claimed two further P-47s shot down 20 minutes later. I. Gruppe was scrambled again in the afternoon which resulted in aerial combat with roughly 12 P-47s near Beauvais. During the course of this encounter, which ended at 17:39, Weissenberger claimed two P-47s shot down.

On 8 June the final elements of I. Gruppe arrived in Montdidier, making the unit complete. In the evening Weissenberger again claimed two P-47s shot down, his 181st and 182nd aerial victories. The airfield at Montdidier came under heavy fighter bomber attack on 11 June followed by another attack on 12 June resulting in significant damage to the airfield. On 12 June Weissenberger filed a claim for three aerial victories. Together with his wingman, Unteroffizier (Sergeant) Alfred Tichy, he took off at 06:00 and during the course of 12 minutes shot down three P-47s. After his first victory, Tichy was killed in action, crashing near Évreux. At 07:02 Weissenberger shot down his third P-47 of the day but his Bf 109 G-5 (Werknummer 110256—factory number) was hit in the engine forcing him to bail out near Saint André. The airfield in Montdidier was rendered unserviceable and I. Gruppe was forced to relocate. It was first moved to Péronne, then to Chauny, a makeshift airfield between Noyon and Tergnier. The constant attacks against German airfields forced another move in July 1944, this time to Frières in the vicinity of Laon.

II. Gruppe flew a combat air patrol on 6 July 1944, resulting in the claim of three Lockheed P-38 Lightnings destroyed. Weissenberger was credited with two of these victories, the first at 08:48 and the second at 08:49, both shot down south of Cambrai. The next day, the Gruppe took off heading for the airspace south of Rosières where they engaged a formation of 15 to 20 P-47s. During this encounter, Weissenberger claimed three victories, numbers 188 to 190. The Gruppe was given a few days of rest and on 13 July were ordered to operate against enemy fighter bombers attacking German positions in the area Rouen – Bernay – Évreux. During this mission, he shot down a Hawker Typhoon at 18:24 near Trouville and another one two minutes later. They were then tasked with a fighter bomber mission on 14 July, attacking enemy positions near Caen. After a number of ground strafing attacks they themselves came under attack of numerous Supermarine Spitfires and P-47s.

The commanding general of II. Jagdkorps (2nd Fighter Corps), Generalleutnant Alfred Bülowius, accompanied by Oberstleutnant Herbert Ihlefeld inspected II. Gruppe at their airfield in Frières on 15 July 1944. On 17 July, Weissenberger led his Gruppe on a number of missions in the combat area near Caen without encountering any enemy aircraft. On their last mission of the day, having taken off at 19:00, they encountered enemy fighter bombers near Caen – Le Mesnil. During aerial combat, the Gruppe lost three pilots without any success for themselves. On 19 July 1944, I. Gruppe was tasked with flying top cover for Jagdgeschwader 2 "Richthofen" and Jagdgeschwader 26 "Schlageter". During this mission, Weissenberger claimed four aerial victories. At 20:22 he shot down his first Typhoon of the mission north of Lisieux, another Typhoon one minute later and his third at 20:25 northwest of Cormeilles. His fourth victory was over a North American P-51 Mustang, shot down at 20:35 near Charleval.

On 25 July 1944, the Gruppe was again tasked with a combat air patrol mission in the greater Caen area. Weissenberger received the order to take off at 10:30 and at 11:00 they spotted Spitfires in the vicinity of Rouen. This was his 199th aerial victory. Two minutes later, at 11:02, he shot down his 200th opponent. Weissenberger left the Gruppe on 30 July 1944 and went on vacation to Bad Wiessee.

His I. Gruppe was withdrawn from combat and moved to Wunstorf for a period of rest and conversion training to the Bf 109 G-14. The ground personnel were transferred to II. Gruppe of Jagdgeschwader 6 (JG 6—6th Fighter Wing). Conversion training ended in October 1944 and I. Gruppe was disbanded shortly after and became III. Gruppe (3rd Group) of JG 6 on 14 October. On 24 October 1944 Weissenberger was ordered to Königsberg in der Neumark, present-day Chojna in Poland. At Königsberg, he was given command of the newly forming I. Gruppe of Jagdgeschwader 7 "Nowotny" (JG 7—7th Fighter Wing).

Flying the Messerschmitt Me 262
JG 7 "Nowotny" was the first operational jet fighter wing in the world and was named after Walter Nowotny, who was killed in action on 8 November 1944. Nowotny, a fighter pilot credited with 258 aerial victories and recipient of the Knight's Cross of the Iron Cross with Oak Leaves, Swords and Diamonds, had been assessing the Messerschmitt Me 262 jet aircraft under operational conditions. JG 7 "Nowotny" was equipped with the Me 262, an aircraft which was heavily armed and faster than any Allied fighter. General der Jagdflieger (General of the Fighter Force) Adolf Galland hoped that the Me 262 would compensate for the Allies' numerical superiority. On 12 November 1944, the Oberkommando der Luftwaffe (OKL—Air Force High Command) ordered JG 7 "Nowotny" to be equipped with the Me 262. Galland appointed Oberst Johannes Steinhoff as its first Geschwaderkommodore (wing commander).

JG 7 "Nowotny" was initially formed with the Stab (headquarters unit) and III. Gruppe  at Brandenburg-Briest from the remnants of Kommando Nowotny. I. Gruppe was created on 27 November from pilots and personnel from II. Gruppe of Jagdgeschwader 3 "Udet" (JG 3—3rd Fighter Wing) and placed under the command of Weissenberger. Weissenberger's appointed Staffelkapitäne in I. Gruppe were Oberleutnant Hans Grünberg, Oberleutnant Fritz Stehle, and Oberleutnant Hans Waldmann, commanding 1.–3. Staffel respectively.

On New Year's Day 1945, Weissenberger married his teenage-love Cilly Vogel in Langenselbold near Hanau. Best man at his wedding was his former JG 5 comrade and friend Walter Schuck. Schuck succeeded Waldmann as Staffelkapitän of the 3. Staffel following the latter's death in a flying accident on 18 March 1945. Weissenberger was promoted to Major on 1 January 1945 and replaced Steinhoff as Geschwaderkommodore of JG 7 "Nowotny" shortly after. Both Galland and Steinhoff, among others, were relieved of their commands in the aftermath of the Fighter Pilots' Revolt in early 1945.

Under his command, JG 7 "Nowotny" achieved some success before the end of World War II in Europe on 8 May 1945. On 18 March 1945, JG 7 "Nowotny" claimed 25 aerial victories over Berlin, among them three Boeing B-17 Flying Fortresses shot down by Weissenberger. On 4 April, the United States Army Air Forces (USAAF) Eighth Air Force dispatched 1,431 heavy bombers, escorted by 850 fighter aircraft, to northern Germany. The bombers targets included the harbor and residential areas of Kiel and Hamburg and five Luftwaffe airfields, including Parchim Airfield where III. Gruppe of JG 7 was based. Defending against this attack, Weissenberger shot down a B-17 bomber near Bremen, his last claim. Over all, he achieved eight confirmed victories, seven B-17 bombers and a P-51 fighter, while flying the Me 262. Weissenberger survived the war and was credited with a total of 208 aerial victories, including 33 over the Western Front, claimed in 375 combat missions.

Later life

Weissenberger became a motor racing driver after the war, and was killed at the Nürburgring circuit on 11 June 1950, when his modified BMW 328 single seater (Veritas), start number 15, crashed on the first lap of the XV Eifelrennen, a Formula Three motor race.

Summary of career

Aerial victory claims
According to US historian David T. Zabecki, Weissenberger was credited with 208 aerial victories. Mathews and Foreman, authors of Luftwaffe Aces — Biographies and Victory Claims, researched the German Federal Archives and found records for 208 aerial victory claims, plus two further unconfirmed claims. This figure of confirmed claims includes 175 aerial victories on the Eastern Front and 33 on the Western Front, including seven four-engined bombers and 8 victories with the Me 262 jet fighter.

Victory claims were logged to a map-reference (PQ = Planquadrat), for example "PQ 36 Ost 3914". These sectors were then subdivided into 36 smaller units to give a location area 3 × 4 km in size.

Awards
Weissenberger received the following awards:
 Iron Cross (1939 variant)
 2nd Class  (6 November 1941)
 1st Class (17 February 1942)
 Honorary Cup of the Luftwaffe on 1 July 1942 as Oberfeldwebel and pilot
 German Cross in Gold on 8 September 1942 as Oberfeldwebel in the 10.(ZS)/JG 5
 Knight's Cross of the Iron Cross with Oak Leaves
 Knight's Cross on 13 November 1942 as Leutnant (war officer) and pilot in the 6./JG 5
 266th Oak Leaves on 2 August 1943 as Oberleutnant (war officer) and Staffelkapitän of the 7./JG 5

Weissenberger was recommended for the Knight's Cross of the Iron Cross with Oak Leaves and Swords by Steinhoff after his 200th aerial victory.  The recommendation was received by the Oberkommando der Luftwaffe/Luftwaffenpersonalamt (OKL/LP—Air Force High Command/Air Force Staff Office) on  29 January 1945, but was declined on 20 February 1945. At the time, 240 aerial victories were required for the Swords to be awarded.

Dates of rank

Notes

References

Citations

Bibliography

 
 
 
 
 
 
 
 
 
 
 
 
 
 
 
 
 
 
 
 
 
 
 
 

1914 births
1950 deaths
People from Mühlheim am Main
Luftwaffe pilots
German World War II flying aces
People from the Grand Duchy of Hesse
Recipients of the Gold German Cross
Recipients of the Knight's Cross of the Iron Cross with Oak Leaves
German racing drivers
German Formula Three Championship drivers
Racing drivers who died while racing
Sport deaths in Germany
Military personnel from Hesse